Beenie Man Meets Mad Cobra is the sixth studio album by Beenie Man. Every track on the album features Jamaican reggae artist Mad Cobra.

Track listing
"Defend Apache" (featuring Mad Cobra) – 3:38
"Once a Year" (featuring Mad Cobra) – 4:04
"Dis de Man" (featuring Mad Cobra) – 3:55
"Bury Yu Dead" (featuring Mad Cobra)– 3:47
"Tek Weh Yu Girl" (featuring Mad Cobra) – 3:46
"Name Yu Call" (featuring Mad Cobra) – 3:54
"More Dem Talk" (featuring Mad Cobra) – 3:42
"Dem Haffi Move" (featuring Mad Cobra) – 3:41
"Wife Already" (featuring Mad Cobra) – 3:49
"Gun Pop Off" (featuring Mad Cobra) – 3:41
"Gun Finger" (featuring Mad Cobra) – 3:41
"Look Yu Man" (featuring Mad Cobra) – 3:52

References

Beenie Man albums
1995 albums
VP Records albums